Mesogramma may refer to:
 Mesogramma (plant), a genus of plants in the family Asteraceae
 Mesogramma, a genus of flies in the family Syrphidae, synonym of Mesograpta
 Mesogramma, a genus of butterflies in the family Geometridae, synonym of Mesotype
 Mesogramma, a fossil genus of insects in the family Hebeigrammidae, synonym of Hebeigramma